Bojerud is a surname. Notable people with the surname include:

Fredrik Bojerud (born 1970), Swedish politician
Stellan Bojerud (1944–2015), Swedish politician